Moturi is an Indian surname.
 Moturi Hanumantha Rao, an Indian politician
 Moturi Udayam, an Indian politician and women's rights activist
 Moturi Satyanarayana, an Indian parliamentarian and Hindi activist

Indian surnames